Waqar Zaka is a Pakistani television host, activist, and cryptocurrency expert/entrepreneur.

Early life
According to Zaka, he is 2008-09 batch Civil Engineer of NED University of Engineering & Technology.

Zaka started his career from Indus Music. After earning fame as VJ, he started hosting a TV reality show Living on the Edge. Waqar then created and hosted reality shows XPOSED, King of Street Magic, Desi Kudiyan and The Cricket Challenge aired on ARY Musik.

During the 2013 Pakistani general election, Zaka ran for the seat of the National Assembly of Pakistan from Karachi NA-253 constituency, but was unsuccessful and secured only 31 votes out of the 211,768 total votes cast. Zaka claims he ran to demonstrate how to run for election for his show Main Banoonga Minister; he stated that this was "the only entertaining way of telling our youth how to be a part of the system". He ran on a platform of prioritizing and improving access to entertainment and the internet.

In April 2019, Zaka announced a political movement in Pakistan called Tehreek-e-Tech. In May 2019, he apologized to the people for destroying the young minds via his TV reality show Living on the Edge.

Champions with Waqar Zaka
In November 2019, Zaka began hosting a TV reality show, Champions with Waqar Zaka, on BOL Network. In January 2020, the show was banned by the Pakistan Electronic Media Regulatory Authority (PEMRA) for being "offensive towards social, religious and cultural values of this country". In April 2020, the Islamabad High Court upheld the decision of PEMRA to ban the show.

Following the suspension of Champions, Zaka began hosting a late night show on YouTube called Headphone Show.

Awards and nominations
In 2017, Zaka received an award from Abdul Qadeer Khan for his social and humanitarian work in the war-torn areas of Syria and Myanmar. Waqar Zaka has been nominated by Binance for the Bananas Influencer Awards 2021 on 25 June. A total of five influencers from around the world were nominated for the award by Binance. He also received the Social Media Icon of the Year 2021 Award in the UAE.

Crypto Mining 
Waqar Zaka has started an online academy for cryptocurrency that focuses on simplifying the concepts for average person. He is also starting Pakistan's first crypto mining farm using hydropower in an attempt to bring Pakistan to the list of most developed countries. Earlier, he had vouched to legalize cryptocurrencies in Pakistan through his political party Tehreek-e-Technology Pakistan.

Achievements 
Waqar Zaka formed Pakistan's first blockchain-based microfinance platform named TenUp. He filed the case in the Sindh High Court as a petitioner, without any lawyer, about legalizing cryptocurrency in Pakistan and achieved success. Through TenUp, Waqar Zaka has also developed a currency for the use of State Bank of Pakistan (SBP). He also claimed that this currency will eradicate the need for PayPal in Pakistan and allow for fastest transactions. He has been raising awareness about legalizing digital currency in Pakistan that can help in paying off the debt of the country and bring it among the richest countries in the world. He also offered free of cost services to entrepreneurs and professionals to develop a blockchain system using cryptocurrency. Due to his efforts, the Government of Khyber Pakhtunkhwa has launched Pakistan's first advisory committee for cryptocurrency and crypto mining. Advisor to Chief Minister Khyber Pakhtunkhwa on Science and Technology & Information Technology, Zia Ullah Bangash has also thanked Waqar Zaka for offering cooperation and support to the KP government. 

Zaka has several times moved the court against internet censorship. He moved the Islamabad High Court against ban on popular multiplayer game, PlayerUnknown's Battlegrounds (PUBG), which was ruled in his favor. He also filed a case to upgrade the Computer's course in Sindh Board, which was not upgraded since 1997. He filed the case without lawyer and won it, with the court ordering the Sindh Board to upgrade the syllabus. It was termed as a massive achievement for Waqar Zaka by the youth and the media. He also helped save three men accused of blasphemy in Dunga Bunga. He went to the town by taking a flight from Nepal, got the fake FIR removed against them and convinced the mop of fake accusations against the three men. He also streamed the evidence on his Facebook page to highlight the cause of saving minorities in Pakistan.

Waqar Zaka has been appointed as a Crypto Expert by the Government of Pakistan in the advisory committee. The move came in pursuance of the resolution and recommendation of the Provincial Assembly of Khyber Pakhtunkhwa regarding Digital Assets. Zaka has vowed to work for free for the country, he announced it on his official Twitter Account.

Waqar Zaka also met the Olympian Arshad Nadeem and presented PKR 1 million on his outstanding performance in Tokyo Olympics 2020 in Javelin Throw.

Waqar Zaka's TenUp Smart, which is Pakistan's first cryptocurrency token, is now listed on an international exchange OKX. Zaka is also partnering with NED University to introduce the first metaverse project of Pakistan.

Zaka received the Social Media Icon of the Year Award 2020 from PISA UAE awards. He was also included in the jury for PISA Awards 2021.  

Zaka is also known for his predictions related to crypto market. During a live session on his Facebook page, he made $7800 from Bitcoin predictions.

Jury Member of PISA 2021 
Zaka was appointed as the expert content maker to become judge of social media awards 2021 and 2022 , PISA , Pakistan International Screen Awards UAE & jury member for the entire awards along with the top names from Media industry.

References

External links 
 

Living people
VJs (media personalities)
Pakistani television hosts
People from Karachi
Pakistani stunt performers
People from Sargodha
NED University of Engineering & Technology alumni
1978 births
Pakistani politicians
Pakistani media personalities